The 2020 Payback was the sixth and final Payback professional wrestling pay-per-view and livestreaming event produced by WWE. It was held for wrestlers from the promotion's Raw and SmackDown brand divisions. The event took place on August 30, 2020, from the WWE ThunderDome, hosted at the Amway Center in Orlando, Florida. It was the first Payback held since the 2017 event, but was the final Payback as no further events were scheduled. The theme of the event was wrestlers seeking payback against their opponents.

The card consisted of eight matches, including one on the Kickoff pre-show. In the main event, a returning Roman Reigns, in his first match since February 2020, defeated defending champion "The Fiend" Bray Wyatt and Braun Strowman, who Reigns pinned, in a No Holds Barred Triple Threat match to win SmackDown's Universal Championship. In the preceding match, Rey Mysterio and Dominik Mysterio defeated Seth Rollins and Murphy. In other prominent matches, Keith Lee defeated Randy Orton, and Nia Jax and Shayna Baszler defeated Bayley and Sasha Banks to win the WWE Women's Tag Team Championship.

This event is notable for marking the beginning of Roman Reigns' second reign as Universal Champion, which currently stands as the longest reign in the championship's history, the fifth-longest world championship reign in WWE history, and the longest WWE world championship reign of the modern era.

Production

Background
Payback was a pay-per-view (PPV) and WWE Network event that was established by WWE in 2013. The concept of the event was the wrestlers seeking payback against their opponents. The event ran annually from 2013 to 2017; the 2017 event was also a Raw-exclusive show, but following WrestleMania 34 in 2018, WWE discontinued brand-exclusive pay-per-views, resulting in the reduction of yearly PPVs produced, thus also discontinuing Payback. During the August 14, 2020, episode of SmackDown, it was announced that Payback had been reinstated and would be held on August 30. The sixth event in the Payback chronology, the 2020 event featured wrestlers from both the Raw and SmackDown brands.

Impact of the COVID-19 pandemic

As a result of the COVID-19 pandemic that began affecting the industry in mid-March, WWE had to present the majority of its programming from a behind closed doors set. Initially, Raw and SmackDown's television shows and PPVs were done at the WWE Performance Center in Orlando, Florida. A limited number of Performance Center trainees and friends and family members of the wrestlers were later utilized to serve as the live audience. Just a week prior to Payback, these programs were moved to a bio-secure bubble called the WWE ThunderDome, hosted at Orlando's Amway Center. The select live audience was no longer utilized as the bubble allowed fans to attend the events virtually for free and be seen on the nearly 1,000 LED boards within the arena. Additionally, the ThunderDome utilized various special effects to further enhance wrestlers' entrances, and arena audio was mixed with that of the chants from the virtual fans.

Storylines
The card comprised eight matches, including one on the Kickoff pre-show. The matches resulted from scripted storylines, where wrestlers portrayed heroes, villains, or less distinguishable characters in scripted events that built tension and culminated in a wrestling match or series of matches. Results were predetermined by WWE's writers on the Raw and SmackDown brands, while storylines were produced on WWE's weekly television shows, Monday Night Raw and Friday Night SmackDown.

On the August 14 episode of SmackDown, it was revealed that Bayley and Sasha Banks would defend the WWE Women's Tag Team Championship at Payback. Their opponents were revealed on the August 24 episode of Raw; the team of Nia Jax and Shayna Baszler.

At SummerSlam, "The Fiend" Bray Wyatt defeated Braun Strowman to win the Universal Championship for the second time. Following the match, Roman Reigns made his return after a five-month hiatus and viciously attacked The Fiend and Strowman. The following day, it was announced that The Fiend would defend the title against Strowman and Reigns in a no holds barred triple threat match at Payback. On that Friday's SmackDown, WWE Chairman and CEO Vince McMahon assigned producer Adam Pearce to obtain signatures from the three competitors for their match by the end of the night. After obtaining Wyatt and Strowman's signatures, Pearce located Reigns, where it was revealed that he had aligned himself with Paul Heyman. Reigns affirmed he would be at Payback and win the match, however, he did not sign the contract.

On the August 24 episode of Raw, after attacking WWE Champion Drew McIntyre with two Punts, Randy Orton, who lost to McIntyre at SummerSlam, wanted another rematch for the title, but he was interrupted by former NXT wrestler Keith Lee, making his Raw debut. On behalf of McIntyre, Lee challenged Orton to a match only for Orton to decline. However, the two fought each other later on, with Orton winning via disqualification after McIntyre attacked him. Orton later attacked McIntyre backstage with a third Punt, taking McIntyre out. A rematch between Lee and Orton was subsequently confirmed for Payback.

At SummerSlam, Seth Rollins (who was accompanied by his disciple Murphy) defeated Dominik Mysterio (who was accompanied by his father Rey Mysterio) in a Street Fight. The following night on Raw, Rey Mysterio and Dominik defeated Rollins and Murphy by disqualification when Retribution attacked the Mysterios. A rematch between the two teams was scheduled for Payback.

At SummerSlam, Apollo Crews defeated MVP to retain the United States Championship. The following night on Raw, Crews was scheduled to defend the title against MVP's stablemate of The Hurt Business, Bobby Lashley, at Payback.

Event

Pre-show
During the Payback Kickoff pre-show, The Riott Squad (Ruby Riott and Liv Morgan) faced The IIconics (Peyton Royce and Billie Kay). In the end, Morgan performed the Jersey Codebreaker on Kay followed by Riott performing a Riott Kick on Kay to win the match.

Preliminary matches
The actual pay-per-view opened with Apollo Crews defending the United States Championship against Bobby Lashley (accompanied by MVP and Shelton Benjamin). After a competitive match, Lashley forced Crews to tap out to the Full Lashley Lock to win the title for a second time. Following the match, Crews attacked Lashley and stated that he would win his title back.

Next, Big E faced Sheamus. In the end, Big E performed the Big Ending on Sheamus to win the match.

After that, Matt Riddle fought King Corbin. In the climax, Riddle performed the Floating Bro on Corbin to win the match. Following the match, an irate Corbin attacked Riddle during a backstage interview.

In the next match, Bayley and Sasha Banks defended the WWE Women's Tag Team Championship against Nia Jax and Shayna Baszler. In the closing moments, Baszler applied the Kirifuda Clutch on Bayley while simultaneously applying the death lock on Banks. As Banks attempted to poke the eyes of Baszler, Baszler used Banks' own arm to choke Bayley, who tapped out, to win the title. Following the match, an elated Jax and Baszler celebrated their victory in the ring while a disappointed Bayley and Banks sat at ringside.

Next, Keith Lee faced Randy Orton. During the match, Orton would constantly taunt Lee by stating that Lee should respect him. Outside the ring, Lee threw Orton on the announce table. In the climax, as Orton attempted an RKO, Lee countered into a Spirit Bomb to win the match.

In the penultimate match, father-and-son team, Rey and Dominik Mysterio faced Seth Rollins and Murphy. In the climax, as Rollins attempted a Powerbomb on Mysterio, Mysterio countered out of it, throwing Rollins back. Murphy (the legal partner) then accidentally kicked Rollins in the head, taking him out. Dominik then took advantage and performed a 619 and a splash on Murphy to win the match.

Main event
In the main event, "The Fiend" Bray Wyatt defended the Universal Championship against Braun Strowman and Roman Reigns in a no holds barred triple threat match. The Fiend made his entrance first and after the lights illuminated, he was attacked by Strowman to start the match, despite Reigns having yet entered. This led to The Fiend and Strowman fighting each other. Strowman performed a Powerbomb on The Fiend for a near-fall. The Fiend then performed a Sister Abigail on Strowman for a near-fall. The Fiend then performed an uranage on Strowman through the announce table. The Fiend then obtained his Fiend-themed mallet, however, Strowman rose to his feet and attacked The Fiend. The Fiend then attacked Strowman with the mallet. The Fiend attacked Strowman with the steel steps, after which, both fought on the entrance ramp, where The Fiend threw Strowman into the LED screen atop the stage. As The Fiend attempted Sister Abigail on Strowman on the stage, Strowman countered and performed a spear on The Fiend, knocking The Fiend and himself off the stage. Strowman and The Fiend then fought back in the ring where Strowman attempted a splash on The Fiend. The Fiend, however, countered and performed a superplex off the top rope, causing the ring to implode. Roman Reigns (accompanied by Paul Heyman) then finally made his entrance wielding a chair and signed the match contract, officially entering him into the match. Reigns entered the ring and attempted to pin The Fiend and Strowman, however, both were near-falls. Reigns then attacked Strowman with multiple chair shots and attempted another pin, only to get another near-fall. As Reigns attempted to attack The Fiend with the chair, The Fiend rose to his feet and applied the Mandible Claw on Reigns, who performed a low blow on The Fiend, taking him out. Reigns then performed a Spear on Strowman and pinned him to regain the title for a second time.

Aftermath

Raw
The following night on Raw, three singles matches were set up with the winners of each facing each other in a triple threat match that night to determine the number one contender against Drew McIntyre for the WWE Championship at Clash of Champions. Randy Orton, Keith Lee, and Seth Rollins won their respective matches over Kevin Owens, Dolph Ziggler, and Dominik Mysterio. Orton then won the ensuing triple threat match to secure another shot at McIntyre and the WWE Championship.

Also on the following Raw, The Riott Squad (Ruby Riott and Liv Morgan) faced The IIconics (Peyton Royce and Billie Kay) in a rematch, with the added stipulation that the winning team would earn a shot at the WWE Women's Tag Team Championship while the losing team would disband. The Riott Squad won the match and the title opportunity, while The IIconics had to disband as a team. Their title match was later confirmed for Clash of Champions.

SmackDown
On the following SmackDown, new Universal Champion and a now heel Roman Reigns along with Paul Heyman opened the show. Heyman explained their new partnership in which he said he was serving as the "special counsel" for Reigns (unlike his role of "advocate" for Brock Lesnar). He stated that it was Reigns who brought him back, because just as WWE had essentially all but forgot about Reigns during his hiatus, they had also done the same to Heyman following his own on-screen absence since WrestleMania 36 (albeit a brief appearance at Money in the Bank). He also criticized the fans for their lack of respect for Reigns and his work ethic despite his health issues. He also mocked the fact that Braun Strowman and "The Fiend" Bray Wyatt were chosen to reign as Universal Champion during the past five months, and that neither deserved the title. Heyman also announced that Reigns' challenger for the title at Clash of Champions would be determined in a fatal four-way match that night. Big E, Matt Riddle, King Corbin, and Sheamus were set for the match, however, Big E was deemed unable to compete due to a backstage attack from Sheamus. Reigns' own cousin Jey Uso replaced Big E in the match and subsequently won.

Bayley and Sasha Banks faced Nia Jax and Shayna Baszler in a rematch for the WWE Women's Tag Team Championship. During the match, Banks attempted to attack Baszler, who was teetering on the ring post, with a double knee maneuver, however, Baszler avoided Banks, who injured her left knee on the post. They ultimately lost the match after Jax performed a diving crossbody on Banks and Bayley and pinned both women to retain the title. After the match, medical personnel tended to Banks while a visibly horrified Bayley watched on. Bayley then feigned helping Banks to the backstage area, only to turn on Banks and viciously attack her, effectively disbanding the team.

Future
The 2020 event would in turn be the final Payback event held as an event was not scheduled for 2021. Furthermore, in October that year, WWE announced their PPV schedule for 2022 and Payback was not included.

Results

Notes

References

External links 

2020
2020 WWE Network events
2020 WWE pay-per-view events
2020 in professional wrestling in Florida
Professional wrestling shows in Orlando, Florida
August 2020 events in the United States
Impact of the COVID-19 pandemic on television